Adnan Badr Hassan is a retired Syrian major general, politician and the former chief of Syria's political security directorate.

Background
Hassan hails from Alawite family from Al Mukharram, Homs governorate. He received religious education in Homs and attended the Homs Military Academy.

Career
Hassan was a major general in the Syrian army. In 1973, he fought in Arab-Israeli war and was decorated for his performance. During the illness of the Syrian President Hafez Assad in the period between November 1983 and March 1984 Hassan was made one of the members of the secret military commanders committee. One of Hassan's commands was the ninth mechanized infantry of the army in 1985. He was appointed head of the political security directorate in 1987, replacing Ahmad Said Salih in the post. Hassan was one of Ali Duba's allies during this period. Hassan's term ended in October 2002, and he was replaced by Ghazi Kanaan as head of the political security directorate.

Hassan became a member of the Syrian Regional Branch of the Arab Socialist Ba'ath Party's Central Committee in 2000 following the death of Hafez Assad. Hassan retired from politics in 2005.

Activities
Hassan signed the agreement between Syria and Turkey on 20 October 1998, which established that Syria recognizes the PKK as a terrorist organization. The agreement is known as Adana agreement. He further involved in the security talks between the countries in 2000.

References

Arab Socialist Ba'ath Party – Syria Region politicians
Directors of intelligence agencies
Homs Military Academy alumni
Living people
People from Homs Governorate
Syrian Alawites
Syrian generals
Syrian people of the Yom Kippur War
Year of birth missing (living people)